Reunion Records is a contemporary Christian record label based in Brentwood, Tennessee, that operates under the Provident Label Group. The label was founded in 1982, by Dan Harrell and Mike Blanton.

History 
The label was formed by Amy Grant's managers (Harrell being her brother-in-law), with the label's original intent to give new artist Kathy Troccoli a home after being rejected by the major labels at the time. Troccoli, Michael W. Smith and Rich Mullins were the label's first three artists.

In 1990, they signed a new distribution deal with Geffen Records. In 1992 50% of Reunion Records was sold to BMG and by 1995 the other half was also acquired by BMG. For a time following the BMG acquisition they distributed through RCA Records. From 1995 until 1996, it was part of Arista Records (a BMG company). In October 1996, the label was sold to Zomba Records. Through eventual consolidation, it is now part of Sony Music.

Mike Blanton and Dan Harrell partnered with Steve Thomas to create BHT Entertainment in 2003. The label signed a distribution agreement with Word Records.

Notable artists 
Current roster:

 Steven Curtis Chapman
 Jason Crabb
 Casting Crowns
 Brandon Heath
 Jamie Kimmett
 Rebecca St. James
 Tenth Avenue North
 Tim Timmons
 Matthew West

Former 

 1GN (inactive)
 Austin Adamec (active)
 All Star United (active, with Double Happiness/Fierce UK)
 Anthem Lights (active, independent)
 The Archers (inactive)
 Matt Brouwer (active, with Black Shoe Records)
 Building 429 (active, with 3rd Wave Music)
 Gary Chapman (inactive)
 Ashley Cleveland (active)
 Rick Cua (inactive)
 Kim Hill (active, with 33rd Street Records)
 Michael James (inactive)
 Michael Peace (inactive)
 Wes King (inactive)
 Ana Laura (active, with Integrity Latin)
 Leeland (active, with Essential Records)
 Brian Littrell (active)
 Michael W. Smith (currently on Rocketown Records)
 Lindsay McCaul (active, with Centricity)
 Rich Mullins (deceased)
 Kerrie Roberts (currently independent)
 SHINEmk (disbanded)
 Phil Stacey (active)
 The Prayer Chain (inactive)
 Third Day (disbanded, had moved to Essential Records)
 Kathy Troccoli (active, with KT Records)
 Tauren Wells (active, with Sparrow Records)
 Joy Williams (currently independent)

See also 
 List of record labels

References

External links 
 

American record labels
Record labels established in 1982
Christian record labels
Pop record labels
Sony Music
1982 establishments in Tennessee